The Santa Rosa–Tagaytay Road, also known as the Tagaytay–Santa Rosa Road and the Santa Rosa–Ulat–Tagaytay Road, is a  major thoroughfare in the provinces of Laguna and Cavite, Philippines. Originally an old road linking the Santa Rosa municipal proper to the western edge of the then-municipality at barangay Santo Domingo and narrowly onto barangay Lumil in Silang, the highway was constructed in the late 1990s.

It connects the cities of Santa Rosa and Tagaytay in the provinces of Laguna and Cavite, respectively, and provides access to and from Manila via South Luzon Expressway and Cavite–Laguna Expressway. Its segment in Barangay Balibago, Santa Rosa is also known as Felix Reyes Street (F. Reyes Street) and Balibago Road.

The entire road is a component of National Route 420 (N420) of the Philippine highway network.

Intersections

References 

Roads in Cavite
Roads in Laguna (province)